Athletes from the Federal Republic of Yugoslavia competed at the 1998 Winter Olympics in Nagano, Japan. This was the first Olympic appearance of Montenegrin and Serbian athletes under the Flag of the Federal Republic of Yugoslavia. The nation was banned from the 1994 Winter Olympics due to United Nations war sanctions.

Alpine skiing

References
Official Olympic Reports
International Olympic Committee results database
 Olympic Winter Games 1998, full results by sports-reference.com

Nations at the 1998 Winter Olympics
1998
Olympics